The 2007 World Ringette Championships (2007 WRC) was an international ringette tournament and the 8th (VIII) of the World Ringette Championships. The tournament was organized by the International Ringette Federation (IRF) and was contested in Ottawa, Canada, between October 30 and November 3, 2007. The competition took place at the Ottawa Civic Centre which has since been renamed, "TD Place Arena" and was broadcast in Canada by Rogers TV.

Overview
The final game between Canada and Finland required an added period of overtime.  Finnish player  tied the game 4–4. Finnish player  scored the winning overtime goal ending the game 5–4. Finland won the world championship series.

WRC 2016 was the first time Finland beat Canada in a World Ringette Championship final hosted in Canada. It was also the first time Team Sweden won a World Ringette Championship medal (bronze) by beating Team USA 10–9 in overtime.

Venue

Teams

Final standings

Rosters

Team Finland
The 2007 Team Finland team included the following:

Team Canada
Team Canada competed in the 2007 World Ringette Championships. The 2007 Team Canada team included the following:

Team Sweden

The 2007 Team Sweden Senior team included the following:

Team USA
The 2007 USA Senior team included the following:

See also
 World Ringette Championships
 International Ringette Federation
  Canada national ringette team
  Finland national ringette team
  Sweden national ringette team
  United States national ringette team

References

Ringette
Ringette competitions
World Ringette Championships
Ringette